Rivervale is an unincorporated community and census-designated place (CDP) in Poinsett County, Arkansas, United States, approximately five miles north of Lepanto. It was first listed as a CDP in the 2020 census with a population of 46.

The Rivervale Tunnel, an engineering project in which one river flows under another, is located near Rivervale.

Rivervale was the birthplace of brothers Earlie and William H. Fires. Earlie became a Hall of Fame jockey, and William, a racehorse trainer.

Demographics

2020 census

Note: the US Census treats Hispanic/Latino as an ethnic category. This table excludes Latinos from the racial categories and assigns them to a separate category. Hispanics/Latinos can be of any race.

References

External links
 Riverdale Tunnel, Ark. Dept. of Parks and Recreation

Unincorporated communities in Arkansas
Unincorporated communities in Poinsett County, Arkansas
Jonesboro metropolitan area
Census-designated places in Arkansas
Census-designated places in Poinsett County, Arkansas